Kamisaka Katsu was born in 1892 in Oita prefecture, Japan. 1934 March - 1941 November, deputy team leader, in Taiwan as the infantry regiment, the rank of major, Lieutenant colonel. In 1945 June, the fifty-ninth army fifty-third infantry brigade major general brigade. On August 20 the same year in North Korea by Soviet troops arrested near Hamhung.

War crimes
"In 1942 February, I served as the 163rd infantry regiment commander, when" entrenched in Hebei province Baoding, the "arrest, imprisonment Chinese about 20", "kill, kill with the method of killing". "March", "because of the Wangdu Railway Station and Qing Feng Dian Railway Station Jinghan railway middle area about 10 meters track was to remove the", "caught 10 suspects, the torture and killing of 3, 4". "May", "Wangdu in the vicinity of the railway (West of Wangdu, about 1 km) of a blockhouse was the Eight Route Army was destroyed.", "the 30 inhabitants of torture, kill plan 6, and close to the gun turret 3 houses burnt". "Around June", because in Wangdu occurred blockhouse was the Eight Route Army attack was the destruction of things, "a lot of people tortured, killed 5 suspected collusion, and burned a number of houses".

On May 27, 1942, fighting in the Jizhong, in Hebei County, 22 kilometers to the southeast, "I ordered the first battalion of Army soldiers killed eight residents, about 800 people above", "use the red tube and gas tube by machine gun fire green, not just the Eight Route Army soldiers, and lost to escape Road residents was shot. And the mopping up in the village, many residents to flee into the tunnels and throw it into the red tube and gas tube, green and asphyxia, or escaped to feel the pain of the people, that is, to kill, kill, kill cruelty". Aggressive combat results in ", giving Chinese people's loss is: kill about 1100, destroyed 10 buildings, destroyed 3 buildings, 450 buildings housing to plunder the use time of 10 days, and the cool China people 240 Building 8 turrets (about 10 day)".

The spring of 1943, in the Hebei Xingtang northwestern region, the second brigade "residents killed eight army and about 250 people, destroyed houses about 50". "The armed forces (recorded before the action in each road the lineup will ascertain group) of residents, to make them ahead stepping on a land mine and slaughtered at."

In 1944 May, in Henan, Songxian, for a soldier missing "arrested dozens of residents, and killed 5, 6 and twelve, three houses burnt".

In 1945 June, in Henan "from Xichuan to Xixia turn into" period, "with a captive peer (I think about 50 or so), to the tofu shop south, Yi feeling forward difficult, I ordered the troops' to kill a prisoner '", "all the captives were killed".

References 

Kamisaka Katsu The Original Text of Written Confessions
Kamisaka  Katsu        Criminal confession Book Third
 Anti humanitarian detailed confession, Sakamoto wins with writing in Japanese

Japanese war crimes
1892 births
Military personnel from Ōita Prefecture
Year of death missing